Warnawi Island is a small island which is part of both the Wessel Islands group and the Cunningham Islands in the Northern Territory of Australia. It is one of two islands to do, the other being Bumaga Island.

External links
 Wessel Islands map

Islands of the Northern Territory